KREX-TV, virtual channel 5 (VHF digital channel 2), is a CBS-affiliated television station licensed to Grand Junction, Colorado, United States and serving Colorado's Western Slope region. Owned by Nexstar Media Group, it is a sister station to low-powered, Class A MyNetworkTV affiliate KGJT-CD, channel 27 (which KREX-TV simulcasts on its third digital subchannel); Nexstar also operates Fox affiliate KFQX (channel 4) under a shared services agreement (SSA) with owner Mission Broadcasting. The three stations share studios on Hillcrest Avenue in Grand Junction, where KREX-TV's transmitter is also located.

KREX-TV can also be seen on KGJT-CD's second digital subchannel (UHF channel 27.4 or virtual channel 27.2), which allows homes with issues receiving KREX-TV's VHF signal or only a UHF antenna to receive KREX in some form.

History
Channel 5 first went on the air on May 22, 1954, as KFXJ-TV, owned by Colorado broadcasting pioneer Rex Howell along with KFXJ radio (AM 920). Howell had founded KFXJ in Edgewater, west of Denver, in 1926. It quickly established itself as one of the leading stations in Denver, but was beaten out for a CBS Radio affiliation by KLZ. In response, Howell moved KFXJ to Grand Junction in 1931, and relaunched it as the Western Slope's first radio station. Intrigued by the growth of television, Howell made plans to sign on a television sister in 1951, but a delay in delivering the  tower pushed the sign-on date back three years.

Channel 5 shared a studio with its radio sister on Hillcrest Manor, north of downtown Grand Junction. Howell had built the Art Deco and block glass structure in 1931 for the radio station, but expanded it to two stories to accommodate television. At the time, Hillcrest Manor was the highest populated point in the city. The stations' broadcast tower was located on the grounds next to the studio building.

The station carried programming from all four networks, but was a primary CBS affiliate. It lost DuMont when that network shut down in 1956, but continued carrying programs from CBS, NBC and ABC. During the late 1950s, the station was also briefly affiliated with the NTA Film Network.

The Grand Junction stations then changed their calls to KREX-AM-TV, after their founder. KREX-FM (92.3) signed on in 1960, transmitting from the same tower used by channel 5 at the Hillcrest location. KFXJ Montrose became KREY-TV in 1958. In 1965 Howell acquired then shuttered KJFL-TV Channel 6 in Durango, Colorado and changed its call letters to KREZ-TV, becoming the second satellite station for KREX-TV. This three-station network became known as "XYZ Television", with the calls of all three stations corresponding to the word 'king' ('Rex' coincidentally meaning king in Latin, with 'rey' the Spanish word for king).

Howell sold his stations to a group of Cincinnati businessmen in 1966. However, they missed several payments, and Howell reclaimed control in 1969, running the stations until his death in 1978. In 1984, his heirs sold off his broadcasting empire, earning a handsome return on Rex's original investment of 58 years prior. Channel 5 and its satellites went to Russell Withers, who retained the stations until selling them to Hoak Media in 2003 (Withers however, sold KREZ-TV to Lee Enterprises in 1995).

For 25 years, KREX-TV was the only television station in western Colorado. However, cable providers supplemented it with the Denver stations. Channel 5 has also long claimed a large slice of eastern Utah as part of its primary coverage area, even though it is part of the Salt Lake City market.

Channel 5 finally got some local competition when KJCT signed on in 1979. KJCT took ABC full-time, leaving KREX-TV to shoehorn CBS and NBC onto its schedule. This was very unusual for a two-station market, especially one as small as Grand Junction. However, it made sense in light of the fact that ABC was the top-rated network at the time. Additionally, for the early part of its history, KJCT was a semi-satellite of fellow ABC affiliate KRDO-TV in Colorado Springs. Channel 5 finally lost NBC in 1996 when KKCO signed on. For a time in the 1990s, KREX also carried some Fox programming in the off-hours.

KREX-TV relocated its analog transmitter to the Black Ridge electronics site at the Colorado National Monument west of Grand Junction in 2002. It increased power eightfold, from 12.9 kW to 100 kW visual. The digital transmitter remains at the studio location, operating at a licensed power of only 834 watts.

KREX (AM) eventually moved its frequency to 1100 AM, and increased its power to 50,000 watts. KREX-FM is now KMOZ-FM, broadcasting Country music from a transmitter at the Black Ridge electronics site. It and KNZZ are now owned by MBC Grand Broadcasting. Channel 5 is still based at the Hillcrest Manor studio.

Studio fire

The KREX studios were ravaged by a fire that broke out on January 20, 2008. News reporters Michele Fralick and Lauren Dirks were two of the five persons (two news reporters, two master control operators, and one cleaning person) inside the building at the time of the fire, all of whom escaped without injury and survived. The cause of the fire was not immediately determined and it was initially noted as a cause 'unknown'. The forensics investigations conducted led to follow-up reports that a space heater was concluded as being the source of the fire.  

The Grand Junction Fire Department was forced to pull firefighters from the building shortly after arriving on the scene. The 77-year-old building had been renovated several times, creating many dead air spaces. Fire officials were concerned by the potential for backdrafts, and decided to battle the fire from the exterior only.

The United States Bureau of Alcohol, Tobacco and Firearms assisted with the investigation. It was revealed that the fire started on the top floor (ground level offices) and continued down to the basement. Investigators focused on a heater in the hallway of the upper floor; however, it may be impossible to definitively determine the fire's cause. This was due to the profound level of destruction within the building as well as the decision to allow the fire to burn itself out. Ironically, the station had passed a fire inspection by the Grand Junction Fire Department only a few weeks prior to the fire.

Damage to the facility was estimated at $6 million, making it the most significant fire loss in Grand Junction history. In addition to the losses of equipment and infrastructure, decades of file tapes were lost in the fire, as well as irreplaceable photographs and other archival material, wiping out a comprehensive catalog of the Grand Valley's history.

The station's CBS and Fox feeds went off the air around 10:30 a.m. However, within a few hours, the national CBS and Fox feeds were picked up by the then-local cable provider, Bresnan Communications. Dish Network temporarily replaced KREX and KFQX with their then network-owned Denver counterparts, KCNC-TV and KDVR, respectively. (DirecTV did not have an established local Grand Junction feed.) Due to the high penetration of cable and satellite in this area, most of the area's residents didn't lose access to CBS programming. Cable and satellite are all but essential for acceptable television in much of western Colorado due to the market's rugged terrain. The fire also temporarily knocked out programming to KREX's satellites and massive translator network, as they either were controlled from KREX's studios, or fed off of the source originating at KREX's transmitter.

Recovery and reconstruction

According to KREX General Manager Ron Tillery, the studios were a total loss and the structure is almost demolished. However, the $130,000 transmitter survived without significant damage, as it was housed in a 1960s-era bomb shelter located in the basement of the building. It took crews three days to reach the shelter due to debris and obstructions.

The transmitter was reassembled in a newly built outbuilding located on KREX's current property, and the control room was temporarily housed in a portable building directly behind the transmitter. The station's master control equipment was completely replaced with all-digital equipment, and the trailer featured three separate master controls for KREX's CBS, Fox, and MyNetworkTV affiliates.

The KREX news division moved into temporary quarters at the PBS broadcasting studio at Western Colorado Community College, and staff also worked directly from their homes.

KREX-TV and its three full-power satellites returned to the air on January 30, 2008, with KFQX coming online the following day. As of mid-March, KREX and KFQX both began carrying a full slate of network and syndicated programming, and local news. KGJT-LP began repeating KREX's programming with no variances in the schedule; this lasted until Fall 2008, when a separate schedule with MyNetworkTV programming resumed.

The station's owner, Hoak Media, pledged to reconstruct a "state of the art media and news gathering operation." A number of local businesses donated equipment and other materials to aid in the station's recovery. On August 10, 2009, KREX's new studios were completed. That day, the station premiered its new news set created by Delvin Design Group, its new graphics from VDO, and became the second station behind KJCT to launch local news in high definition.

Dispute with Dish Network
In June 2012, KREX and other Hoak-owned stations were pulled from Dish Network after they failed to renew a carriage agreement. The refusal to renew reportedly surrounds Dish Network's "Hopper" digital video recorder and its controversial commercial-skipping feature AutoHopwhich has also led to complaints from the major U.S. television networks.

Sale to Nexstar Broadcasting Group
On November 20, 2013, Gray Television announced it would purchase Hoak Media and Parker Broadcasting in a $335 million deal. Since Gray already owns KKCO and operates KJCT (which is owned by Excalibur Broadcasting), it decided to spin off KREX and its translators, and KFQX (which is being acquired by Excalibur) to a third-party. On December 19, Gray announced, in a side deal related to the Hoak acquisition, that KREX and its satellites will be sold to Nexstar Broadcasting Group, while KFQX will be sold to Mission Broadcasting, for $37.5 million. The sale of KREX was completed on June 13, 2014, while the KFQX sale was finalized on March 31, 2017. KREG was sold to Weigel Broadcasting in the winter of 2020, and has been repositioned via its cable and satellite carriage as a Denver-area station for its various popular subchannel networks.

News operation

KREX currently produces 22 hours of local news each week (with four hours each weekday and one hour each on Saturdays and Sundays). KREX-TV was the leading news station in the area for many years, but for most of the last decade has been runner-up to KKCO. Some of KREX's newscasts are simulcast on its sister stations, KFQX and KGJT.

Digital television
The stations' digital signals are multiplexed:

KREX-TV digital channels

KREY-TV digital channels

Satellite stations
KREX-TV also operates a satellite station in Montrose, Colorado, KREY-TV (virtual channel 10, VHF digital channel 13). KREY transmits from Flattop Mesa, a hill northeast of Montrose. Due to its relatively weak signal and the area's very uneven terrain, the station uses six translators to relay its signal to the Uncompahgre Valley and surrounding San Miguel mountain communities. Local studios are located on North 1st Street in Montrose. In its earliest days, local programs including Letters to Santa, in which area children were invited to sit on Santa Claus' lap on live television, were made in cramped quarters at the transmitter building, which doubled as KREY's studio through the 1970s. KREY previously produced short news inserts during KREX's weeknight newscasts, though this has since ended.

KREX-TV formerly operated two additional satellite stations, KREZ-TV channel 6 in Durango and KREG-TV channel 3 in Glenwood Springs. KREZ had made several attempts at regional news programs over its 30 years as a semi-satellite of KREX. Eventually, the cost of supplying a  microwave link to Durango plus the relatively small revenue base led to the sale of KREZ in 1995. It is now a satellite of Albuquerque, New Mexico's KRQE. KREG had previously operated as standalone independent station KCWS for five months in 1984; after going dark for two years, it returned to the air as a satellite of KREX in 1987. In 2017, following the merger of Nexstar Broadcasting Group and Media General, KREG, which is considered to be within the Denver television market, was spun off to Marquee Broadcasting, then to Weigel Broadcasting in early 2020.

Translators
In addition to KREY, KREX is seen on a series of low-power translators in western Colorado:

References

External links

CBS network affiliates
Laff (TV network) affiliates
Bounce TV affiliates
Grit (TV network) affiliates
Television channels and stations established in 1954
1954 establishments in Colorado
REX-TV
Nexstar Media Group